Marinobacter xestospongiae is a Gram-negative, slightly halophilic and non-spore-forming bacterium from the genus of Marinobacter which has been isolated from the sponge Xestospongia testudinaria from the sea coast of Saudi Arabia.

References

External links
Type strain of Marinobacter xestospongiae at BacDive -  the Bacterial Diversity Metadatabase

Alteromonadales
Bacteria described in 2012
Halophiles